Urua, Uruaz or Avva was an ancient city of Elam (modern Iran), in the vicinity of Susa and located on the Uqnu river.

Urua was one of the lands conquered by King Eannatum of Lagash in Sumer, circa 2500 BCE:

References

Elamite cities
Former populated places in Iran